Naseem Khan may refer to:
 Naseem Khan (activist) (1939–2017), British activist
 Naseem Khan (politician) (born 1963), Indian politician
 Naseem Khan (sailor) (born 1958), Pakistani sailor